Fabio Cinetti (born 21 October 1973 in Milan) is a retired Italian professional footballer who played as a midfielder.

References

1973 births
Living people
Italian footballers
Serie A players
Serie B players
A.C. Monza players
Vastese Calcio 1902 players
Inter Milan players
Torino F.C. players
A.C. ChievoVerona players
Como 1907 players
Calcio Lecco 1912 players
Italian expatriate footballers
Expatriate footballers in France
Italian expatriate sportspeople in France
Ligue 2 players
OGC Nice players
U.S.D. Olginatese players
U.S. 1913 Seregno Calcio players
Association football midfielders